Anastasia Kostyukova is a retired Russian football defender, playing for various clubs in Russia including Energiya Voronezh.

She was a member of the Russian national team.

Goal National Team

References

1985 births
Living people
Russian women's footballers
Russia women's international footballers
Ryazan-VDV players
Nadezhda Noginsk players
FC Energy Voronezh players
FC Zorky Krasnogorsk (women) players
Women's association football defenders
CSK VVS Samara (women's football club) players
Russian Women's Football Championship players